The 2003 FC Anzhi Makhachkala season was the club's 1st back in the First Division, following their relegation from the Russian Top Division the previous season. They finished the season in 6th place, reaching the semifinals of the 2002–03 Russian Cup and the fifth round of the 2003–04 Russian Cup.

Squad

Transfers

In

Loans in

Out

Competitions

Overview

First Division

League table

Results

Russian Cup

2002–03

2003–04

Squad statistics

Appearances and goals

|-
|colspan="14"|Players who appeared for Anzhi Makhachkala but left during the season:

|}

Goal scorers

Clean sheets

Notes
Terek Grozny played their home games at the Central Stadium in Pyatigorsk due to the War in Chechnya.
From round 24 onwards, Anzhi played their home gets at their new Khazar Stadium.

References

External links
Squad List

2003
Anzhi Makhachkala